Fear Thy Neighbor is an American-Canadian true crime documentary television series which premiered on April 14, 2014 on the Investigation Discovery channel.  The narrator for the series is voice actress Tish Iceton.

The series is an international co-production between the Canadian factual production company Cream Productions, the American cable television network Investigation Discovery, its Canadian version and the French-language Canadian documentary television channel Canal D, which would later be replaced by its crime-focused spinoff Canal D/Investigation, later known as Investigation), with Bell Media, as the owner of Canal D, Investigation and Investigation Discovery Canada, producing the series for Investigation Discovery Canada and Investigation (previously for Canal D) as the parent company of both these channels via their original programming production unit.

The show focuses on various feuds between neighbors, starting over often minor issues (dog bites, noise complaints, property disputes) which escalate into tragedies.

On December 31, 2020, Investigation Discovery premiered a spinoff series, Fear Thy Roommate, in which people are threatened or killed by their roommates in college dorms, apartments, etc.  Season 7 of the main series began on May 7, 2021, with the episode "I’m Not Moving". Season 8 begins on June 13, 2022, with the episode "Blizzard Of Blood."  On October 10. 2022, the series aired its first two-hour episode, "Inferno Of Hate", which was the season 8 finale.

Episodes

Season 1 (2014)

Season 2 (2015)

Season 3 (2016)

Season 4 (2017)

Season 5 (2018)

Season 6 (2019)

Season 7 (2021)

Season 8 (2022)

References

External links 
 

2010s American documentary television series
2010s Canadian documentary television series
2014 American television series debuts
2014 Canadian television series debuts
English-language television shows
Investigation Discovery original programming
True crime television series